Rashid Ali Malik was President and Chief Executive Officer of a leading security company named Security 2000, headquartered in Karachi, Pakistan. He served in the Pakistan Army for 32 years, participated in two wars and for eminent service received 17 medals for war and peace-time service, 2 Commendations from the Chief of Army Staff and the Army Chief Gold Medal. From 1993 to 1995, he was Chairman of the Regional ICAO Hijacking Council. He died on 1 October 2017 in Karachi after fighting a Brain Tumor for 6 months.

Education 
He received his secondary and intermediate education from Cadet College Hasanabdal and graduated from  Peshawar University and Quetta University.

Career 
In 1996, he retired from the Pakistan Army, and in 1997 established his security company. He has been the President and former Chair of the World Association of Detectives, a life member of the International Association of Chiefs of Police (IACP), the Chairman of All Pakistan Security Agencies Association (APSAA) and a frequent speaker at international security seminars on the War on Terror. Have made almost 40 speaking presentations in last 10 years. The subject has generally been “War on Terror” and what is likely to happen. The venue has been Boston University, Colorado University, International Security Seminar in Delhi at the Indian Presidents House, Defence and Security at the Naval and Military Club in London. He is among Board of Governors of the WAD  and among Governing Board of the Washington-based Global Source LLC. He was also Director General of the Pakistan Airports Security Force for five years.

Awards 
He is life member of International Association of Chiefs of Police (USA) since 1993, member Investigation Council of American Society for Industrial Security (USA)since 1995 and member Association of British Investigators (UK) since 2005. In Moscow, for 2004 he received award of “Neal Holmes, Sr. Memorial Security Professional of the Year” from WAD. He won 13 Army medals, 2 Army Chiefs Commendations, won the Army Chiefs Adventure gold medal, the Inter Services Prize Essay Competition as also the highest peacetime Military awards Tamgha-e-Basalat and Sitara-e-Imtiaz.He won 20 gold medals in basketball and tennis and was Captain of the Pakistan basketball team for 13 years. He is also elected President of Sindh Basketball Association (SBA).

References

Pakistan Military Academy alumni
Living people
Recipients of Sitara-i-Imtiaz
Year of birth missing (living people)